Election Commission may refer to:

 Election commission
 Election Commission of India
 Election Commission of Pakistan
 Election Commission of Thailand
 Election Commission of Malaysia
 Election Commission of Sri Lanka
 Election Commission, Nepal
 Bangladesh Election Commission
 Andhra Pradesh State Election Commission